Rauceby railway station is a station near the town of Sleaford, Lincolnshire, England, lying close to the western border of the Parish of Old Sleaford and Quarrington just over half-a-mile south of the village of South Rauceby.

History
The railway station originally served Rauceby Mental Hospital (the former Kesteven Lunatic Asylum, which lies immediately to the south of the railway station and was closed in 1998) and the village of South Rauceby in Lincolnshire, England. The line was built by the Boston, Sleaford and Midland Counties Railway. It now principally serves commuters living in the new housing estates that comprise the Greylees suburb of Sleaford.

The former leader of the Liberal Democrat Party, Nick Clegg, proposed to his wife on a platform at the station.

Station
The station is now owned by Network Rail and managed by East Midlands Railway, which provides all rail services.

A local road crosses the line at the western edge of the platforms, where a signal box and manually operated crossing gates can be seen. The main Grantham to Sleaford road runs to the north of the railway station and crosses the line about a quarter of a mile north east of the station, where automatic barriers are used.

Rauceby still has a working signal box at west end of the station, however the station is unstaffed and offers limited facilities other than two shelters, bicycle storage, timetables and modern 'Help Points'. The full range of tickets for travel are purchased from the guard on the train at no extra cost, there are no retail facilities at this station.

Services
There are no Sunday services. A normal service operates on most Bank holidays.

References

External links

 ; Rauceby station on 1891 OS map.

Railway stations in Lincolnshire
DfT Category F2 stations
Former Great Northern Railway stations
Railway stations in Great Britain opened in 1881
Railway stations served by East Midlands Railway
1881 establishments in England
Sleaford